Lapara bombycoides, the northern pine sphinx is a moth of the family Sphingidae. The species was first described by Francis Walker in 1856.

Distribution 
It is known from coniferous and mixed coniferous forests in southern Canada (Manitoba, Ontario, Quebec, New Brunswick, Nova Scotia and Prince Edward Island) as well as north-eastern Alberta and central Saskatchewan. In the eastern half of the United States it is found from extreme north-eastern North Dakota, Minnesota, Wisconsin, Michigan, Pennsylvania and New York north through Connecticut, Massachusetts, Rhode Island, Vermont, New Hampshire and Maine and south in the Appalachian Mountains from New Jersey to western North Carolina, with scattered ranges as far south as Florida.

Description 
The wingspan is 45–60 mm. It is a variable species. The forewing upperside is darker than in similar Lapara coniferarum and the antemedian lines are more distinct.

Biology 
Adults are on wing from mid-June to mid-July in Canada.

The larvae feed on various pine species, including Pinus resinosa, Pinus rigida and Pinus sylvestris as well as Larix laricina.

References

External links

Sphingini
Moths of North America
Moths described in 1856